Elk Lake may refer to:
Elk Lake, Ontario, a community in James township, Ontario
Elk Lake Airport
Elk Lake Water Aerodrome
Elk Lake School District, in Dimock, Susquehanna County, Pennsylvania
Elk Lake Township, Grant County, Minnesota

Elk Lake may refer to the following lakes:
Elk Lake (Kentucky)
Elk Lake (Michigan), in northern Michigan
 Elk Lake in Clearwater County, Minnesota, headwaters of the Mississippi River, south of Lake Itasca
Elk Lake (Douglas County, Minnesota), a lake in Douglas County
Elk Lake (Grant County, Minnesota)
 Elk Lake in Missoula County, Montana
 Elk Lake in Park County, Montana
 Elk Lake in Wheatland County, Montana
Elk Lake (New York)
Elk Lake (Oregon)
Elk Lake (Sawtooth Wilderness)
Elk Lake (British Columbia), in Saanich, British Columbia

See also
Elk Lakes (disambiguation)
Ełk Lake, Poland